AC Ace is a car which was produced by AC Cars of Thames Ditton, England, from 1953 until 1963.

History
AC came back to the market after the Second World War with the 2-Litre range of cars in 1947, but it was with the Ace sports car of 1953 that the company really made its reputation in the post war years. Casting around for a replacement for the ageing 2-Litre, AC took up a design by John Tojeiro that used a light, ladder-type tubular frame, all independent transverse leaf spring suspension, and an open two-seater alloy body made using English wheeling machines, possibly inspired by the Ferrari Barchetta of the day.

It was hardly a sporting engine however, and it was felt that something more modern and powerful was required to put the modern chassis to good use.

Joining the Ace in 1954 was the Aceca hard top coupé, which had an early form of hatchback rear door but used the same basic timber framed alloy body.

From 1956, there was the option of Bristol Cars' two-litre  straight-six with 3 downdraught carburettors and slick four-speed gearbox. Overdrive was available from 1956 and front disc brakes were an option from 1957, although they were later standardised.

In 1961 a new 2.6-litre straight-six 'Ruddspeed' option was available, adapted by Ken Rudd from the unit used in the Ford Zephyr. It used three Weber or SU carburettors and either a 'Mays' or an iron cast head. However, it was not long before Carroll Shelby drew AC's attention to the Cobra, so only 37 of the 2.6 models were made. These Ford engined models had a smaller grille which was carried over to the Cobra.

For the Ace as well as the Aceca, AC used chassis numbers beginning with AE for AC-engined cars, BE for Bristol-engined ones, and RS for those equipped with the Ford unit. An "X" following the first two letters indicated an export model. With the engine set well back in the chassis, the Ace handled well and was successful in competition.

Motor Sport
The car raced at Le Mans in 1957 and 1958. In the 1959 24 Hours of Le Mans, Ted Whiteaway and John Turner drove their AC Ace Bristol, registration 650BPK, to the finish, claiming top honours for the 2,000cc GT class and seventh overall behind six 3 litre cars. Few cars with this provenance have survived and are extremely valuable.  They can range from $100,000 or more for an unrestored car, even one in pieces, to in excess of $400,000 for a restored AC Ace.

AC Cobra

When Bristol ceased building their 6-cylinder engine in 1961, AC's owner, Charles Hurlock, was approached by Carroll Shelby to use a Ford V8 in the Ace chassis, producing the AC Cobra in 1962. Production of the Ace ended the same year.  The AC Cobra came in small block and later big block configurations.  It was Ford's 289 that powered the winning car in the GT class at Le Mans in June 1964. At the time, the AC Cobra 427 was the fastest "production" car in the world.

AC Automotive

AC Automotive, based in Straubenhardt, Germany still builds the AC under the original name. Cars are sold in Germany, France and England with sales in Luxembourg, Holland, Lichtenstein, Switzerland and Belgium slated for the future. Pricing for the standard ACGT model starts at £104,400 before options.

Replicas
As with the Cobra, some AC Ace replicas have been made, such as the Hawk Ace, but are much rarer.

External reference

AC Ace replica
Prices and Options ENGLAND without VAT (archived from www.ac-automotive.com)

References

Sports cars
Ace
Cars introduced in 1953
1960s cars
24 Hours of Le Mans race cars